Quazarz: Born on a Gangster Star is the third studio album by American hip hop duo Shabazz Palaces, released on July 14, 2017. The album was released simultaneously with and as a companion album to Quazarz vs. The Jealous Machines. The album features Thundercat, Loud Eyes Lou, The Palaceer Lazaro, and Darrius.

Track listing

Personnel
Thaddillac – guitar, synthesizer
Erik Blood – bass, mixing
Thundercat – bass guitar on "Since C.A.Y.A."

References

2017 albums
Sub Pop albums
Shabazz Palaces albums